Ganurags (from Latvian: "shepherd's horn") is a Latvian folk clarinet with a cylindrical wooden body onto which an animal-horn bell is attached to amplify the sound. Key systems were added to the instrument in the 20th century.

See also
 Birbynė
 Zhaleika
 Hornpipe

References

Clarinets
Latvian musical instruments